Carlos Medina Plascencia (born 14 August 1955 in León, Guanajuato) is a Mexican politician affiliated with the conservative National Action Party (PAN). He is a former mayor of León, senator and interim governor of Guanajuato (1991 – 1995). He was the President of the Chamber of Deputies in 1999. In 2005 he ran for president of the PAN but lost against Manuel Espino.

He is the son of Carlos Medina Torres and María del Carmen Plascencia Fonseca. He graduated with a bachelor's degree in chemical engineering and a master's degree in business administration from the Monterrey Institute of Technology and Higher Studies (ITESM), where he worked as a professor from 1980 to 1981. In 1985, he joined the National Action Party and a year later was elected city councilor of León. Three years later he won the mayorship of the municipality.

See also
 List of Monterrey Institute of Technology and Higher Education faculty
 List of mayors of León, Mexico

References

Bibliography
Diccionario biográfico del gobierno mexicano, Ed. Fondo de Cultura Económica, Mexico, 1992.

External links
 Official website

 	 
 

1955 births
Living people
Governors of Guanajuato
Members of the Senate of the Republic (Mexico)
Presidents of the Chamber of Deputies (Mexico)
Municipal presidents in Guanajuato
Politicians from Guanajuato
People from León, Guanajuato
National Action Party (Mexico) politicians
Monterrey Institute of Technology and Higher Education alumni
Academic staff of the Monterrey Institute of Technology and Higher Education
21st-century Mexican politicians
20th-century Mexican politicians